Funniest Show on Earth is a 1953 Italian comedy film directed by Mario Mattoli and starring May Britt. It is the first Italian film in 3D.

It was filmed with a three-dimensional shooting system patented by Carlo Ponti and Dino De Laurentiis and called "PoDelVision" (from the initials of their surnames), which prescribed the simultaneous use of more cameras and then the printing of two identical copies of films: one for the left eye and one for the right eye.

The film is an explicit parody of Cecil B. DeMille's The Greatest Show on Earth.

Plot
In the circus a clown named Tottons Togni (Totò), forced to never remove his make-up to avoid revealing his real identity, is constantly haunted by the jealousy of three women (a lion tamer, a fantasist, a trapeze artist) and also by the investigations of a police officer.

Cast
 Totò as Tottons, il clown / Una signora del pubblico
 May Britt as Brigitte, la domatrice
 Mario Castellani as Il domatore
 Peppino De Filippo as Uno spettatore
 Bianca Maria Fabbri
 Franca Faldini as Yvonne, la soubrette
 Enzo Garinei as Altro presentatore
 Fanny Landini
 Marc Lawrence as Il proprietario del circo
 Salvo Libassi
 Alberto Sorrentino as Bastian
 Anthony Quinn as Spettatore
 Silvana Mangano as Spettatrice

References

External links

1953 films
1953 3D films
1953 comedy films
1950s parody films
1950s Italian-language films
Italian parody films
Italian 3D films
Films directed by Mario Mattoli
Circus films
Lux Film films
1950s Italian films